0F (zero F) may refer to:

Zero degrees Fahrenheit, which is -18°C
Caledonian Railway 0F Class
LMS Kitson Class 0F, a classification of LMS Kitson 0-4-0ST

See also
F0 (disambiguation)